Leonardo Mendonça da Rosa (born 21 May 1987), commonly known as Leo Jaraguá or just Leo, is a Brazilian born Kazakhstani futsal player who plays for Sporting CP and the Kazakhstani national futsal team as a defender and winger.

Career
Leo started his career in his hometown team and Brazilian powerhouse, Jaraguá, followed by short stints at Tubarão, and Foz Futsal. In 2009 he was invited by a friend to play for Kairat Almaty in Kazakhstan where he played for eight seasons, winning two UEFA Futsal Cups at the club. After having previously spent one season on loan from Kairat Almaty at Sporting CP Leo made a permanent move to the team in the summer of 2018.

Personal life
He is the older brother of Daniel Rosa, a futsal player who played alongside Leo at Kairat Almaty in the 2017/18 season.

References

External links
FPF club profile

1987 births
Living people
Futsal defenders
Futsal forwards
Kazakhstani men's futsal players
Brazilian men's futsal players
Brazilian expatriate sportspeople in Kazakhstan
Brazilian expatriate sportspeople in Portugal
Brazilian emigrants to Kazakhstan
Naturalised citizens of Kazakhstan
Sporting CP futsal players